Nicodemo is both a surname and a given name. Notable people with the name include:

Attilio Nicodemo (born 1974), Italian footballer
Tony Nicodemo, American basketball player
Nicodemo Ferrucci (1574–1650), Italian Baroque painter
Nicodemo Scarfo (1929–2017), American crime boss